Edgewood Historic District is a historic district located in the west-central portion of New Haven, Connecticut.  It was listed on the National Register of Historic Places in 1986.  A predominantly residential area roughly bisected by Edgewood Avenue, a broad boulevard which features a large central esplanade and forms the principal east-west artery through the heart of the district. The area includes 232 contributing buildings, 4 other contributing structures, and 1 contributing object.  Most of these were built between about 1888 and 1900, and represent the city's first neighborhood planned under the tenets of the City Beautiful movement.  They are generally either Queen Anne or Colonial Revival in style, and are set (especially on the boulevard-like Edgewood Avenue) on larger lots.

The district's most notable topographical feature is the West River, which runs through Edgewood Park in the eastern end of the district on a north-south axis. From the West River, the landscape
rapidly rises about forty feet to Yale Avenue on the west. Edgewood Park also includes memorials for the Spanish–American War and the Holocaust. The park's current layout was designed in 1910 by Frederick Law Olmsted, Jr. The district includes the central portion of the Edgewood neighborhood, which is generally the area bounded by Whalley Avenue, Sherman Avenue, Chapel Street, and Edgewood Park. The district also borders the Dwight Street Historic District on the east.

Edgewood Avenue and is served by route 246 of Connecticut Transit New Haven. The main north-south road is Ella Grasso Boulevard (Route 10).

See also
National Register of Historic Places listings in New Haven, Connecticut

References

External links

Edgewood Park Historic District, New Haven Preservation Trust website (text adapted from NRHP nomination)

Historic districts in New Haven, Connecticut
Queen Anne architecture in Connecticut
Colonial Revival architecture in Connecticut
Neighborhoods in New Haven, Connecticut
National Register of Historic Places in New Haven, Connecticut
Historic districts on the National Register of Historic Places in Connecticut